Sprung Aus Den Wolken is a German musical group based out of Berlin, part of Berlin's underground music movement of the 1980s - sometimes referred to as the "Geniale Dilletanten" movement. Their music is typically minimalistic industrial music.

The band's name is German for "Jump from the Clouds." The origin of this title is unknown, however it should be known that the phrase was the title of a 1963 board game, although the possibility that it is a German idiom or simply just made up should not be ruled out either. Also, "Sprung aus den Wolken" was the title of the German broadcasts of Ripcord (TV series) in the 1960s.

Members

Fred Alpi
Kiddy Citny
Peter Prima

Contributing Artists:
Alexander Hacke
N.U. Unruh
Raymond Watts

Discography

Dub And Die (1981)
Untitled (1982)
Untitled (1983)
Voyage Organise Dijon 26-08-82 (1983)
Pas Attendre (1985)
The Story of Electricity (1987)
You Lucky Star (circa 1990)
Round And Round (1991)
Early Recordings (2004)
Lion/Sei Still (2005)
Early Recordings Plus (2006)

Sources

German musical groups